TaJuan Akeem Perry (born May 7, 1975), better known by his stage name Big Noyd, is an American rapper from Queensbridge, Queens, New York. He is closely affiliated with Mobb Deep and is featured on all of their albums except Blood Money.

Career
Big Noyd's debut was his verse on "Stomp 'Em Out" from Mobb Deep's 1993 debut Juvenile Hell, but it was not until 1995, on Mobb Deep's album The Infamous, that Big Noyd attracted wider attention. He appeared on "Right Back At You", “Party Over”, & "Give Up the Goods (Just Step)". He explained later that he received his first contract, for $300,000, from Tommy Boy because of his verse on "Give Up The Goods (Just Step)".

His debut album Episodes Of A Hustla was released in 1996 on Tommy Boy Records. Noyd was incarcerated at the time of its release. According to Prodigy, the album sold a "disappointing 30,000 copies". In 2003, Big Noyd returned with his second album, Only The Strong. This album, just as his debut, had many Mobb Deep-related features. Noyd attributes the lackluster sales to Landspeed Records' (which became Traffic Entertainment Group) filing for bankruptcy in an unrelated lawsuit just as the album was being released. In 2004, Big Noyd released his third album, On the Grind, also featuring many guest-spots by Mobb Deep-related artists. The album was released independently through Monopolee Records, which Noyd helped to found and released under his full control, preventing issues that happened with Landspeed and Tommy Boy Records. He founded Noyd Inc. in 2007.

He got his rap name from a friend who thought he looked like Domino's Pizzas advertising character 'The Noid'.

Personal life
He is of Puerto Rican and African American descent. He has a daughter who still lives in Queensbridge, Queens.

Discography

References

External links
 Big Noyd: Infamous minded Interview NobodySmiling.com
 Big Noyd: Illustrious Interview ArtOfRhyme.com
 Big Noyd: Illustrious Interview SmokingSection.net

1975 births
Living people
African-American male rappers
American people of Puerto Rican descent
Hispanic and Latino American rappers
Five percenters
Tommy Boy Records artists
People from Long Island City, Queens
Rappers from New York City
Gangsta rappers
21st-century American rappers
21st-century American male musicians
21st-century African-American musicians
20th-century African-American people